General Woods may refer to:

Charles R. Woods (1827–1885), Union Army brigadier general and brevet major general
Henry Woods (British Army officer) (1924–2019), British Army major general
Louis E. Woods (1895–1971), U.S. Marine Corps lieutenant general
William Burnham Woods (1824–1887), Union Army brigadier general and brevet major general

See also
General Wood (disambiguation)
Attorney General Woods (disambiguation)